Gavin Keane (born 5 March 1966) is a former Australian rules footballer who played with Essendon and the Brisbane Bears in the Victorian/Australian Football League (VFL/AFL).

Keane, who was recruited from St Bernard's, averaged just under 20 disposals from 16 appearances in 1987, his first league season. He added another 13 games in 1988 but didn't play VFL football in 1989.

Traded to Brisbane at the end of the 1989 season, Keane played seven games at his new club in 1990, all losses.

A wingman, he also spent some time in the Victorian Football Association playing with Williamstown.

References

1966 births
Australian rules footballers from Victoria (Australia)
Essendon Football Club players
Brisbane Bears players
Williamstown Football Club players
Living people